Sharp Island or Kiu Tsui Chau is the largest island in the Kiu Tsui Country Park located at Port Shelter of Sai Kung, Hong Kong. The area is most known for fishing, swimming as well as diving. Sharp Island is under the administration of Sai Kung District.

Geography
The island has a maximum elevation of 136m and an area of 1 km². The two beaches, Half Moon Bay Beach (also known as Hap Mun Bay), and Kiu Tsui Beach are located on the island. Both are managed by the Hong Kong Leisure and Cultural Services Department.

When the predicted tides at Ko Lau Wan is lower than or equal to +1.40 meters, visitors are able to visit Kiu Tau, an inshore islet, on foot.

Different kind of volcanic rocks can be found on Sharp Island. The most frequent ones are rocks with a peculiar pattern on the surface. Other rocks have an unusual pineapple-shaped form.

History

Origin of the different kinds or rocks
It is believed that about 140 million years ago a volcano was located in Sai Kung. Sharp Island was on the margin of the caldera. This is probably the reason for the widely distributed different volcanic rocks from different geological periods around Sharp Island.

Formation of the tombolo
The sea currents near Sharp Island pushed sand and gravel near the shore. After several years they formed a tombolo, a natural bridge made of different sized rocks and sand – connecting Sharp Island and Kiu Tau. At high tide the tombolo is submerged in water and thus can only be seen when the tide goes out.

Biodiversity
There are over 70% of stony corals coverage around the island. An endangered flora Tetrathyrium subcordatum is found on the south of the island.

Conservation
A small portion of Sharp Island is designated as the Sharp Island Special Area. It covers 649 square metres and was designated in 2011. The area is located west of the pier at Kui Tsui Beach. The geology of the area is characterised by volcanic rocks of the Cretaceous period.

Transportation
Sharp Island is accessible by ferry from Sai Kung Town.

See also

 Hong Kong UNESCO Global Geopark
 List of islands and peninsulas of Hong Kong

References

External links

 Memories of volcanic lava flows － Sharp Island

Sai Kung District
Islands of Hong Kong
Volcanism of Hong Kong
Hong Kong UNESCO Global Geopark
Tombolos
Uninhabited islands of Hong Kong